Mark McNally (born 10 March 1971) is a Scottish former footballer who played in defence, primarily as a centre-half although he also played occasionally at right-back.

Career

Celtic to England
McNally began his career with Celtic youths and progressed on to the first team, making his debut against Motherwell in November 1990 in a 2–1 win. McNally went on to become a regular member of the Celtic first team for the next few seasons, making over 100 league appearances. He struggled for a place in the team during season 1994–95 under new manager Tommy Burns, but still won the Scottish Cup Final in what transpired to be his final game for the club. After a very brief period on loan at Manchester City, McNally was transferred to Southend United in December 1995 for £50,000. McNally made his debut for Southend United on 17 August 1996 against Tranmere Rovers. McNally spent two seasons with Southend United making over fifty league appearances for the club before being transferred to Stoke City for £120,000 in 1997. McNally made his debut for Stoke City on 31 March 1997 against Bradford City. McNally was released by Stoke City at the end of the 1997–98 season after making only seven appearances for the club.

Return to Scotland
After McNally was released by Stoke City he returned to Scotland to join Dundee United making his debut for the club against Kilmarnock on 1 August 1998. In January 2000 McNally was placed on loan to Ayr United until the end of the season. McNally made his debut for Ayr United on 12 February 2000 against Falkirk. At the end on the 1999/2000 season McNally was released by Dundee United to enable him to sign up for Partick Thistle. McNally made his debut for Partick on 7 October 2000. McNally was at Partick for a season, scoring once against Stranraer, and was released despite being the fans player of the season. After being released by Partick Thistle, McNally was signed by Clydebank making his debut on 4 August 2001 against Forfar Athletic. McNally stayed at Clydebank until the club removed from both the Scottish Football League and the Scottish Football Association. McNally went on to join former Partick Thistle teammate Allan Moore at Stirling Albion where he made his debut against Albion Rovers on 3 August 2002. McNally went on to make over 100 appearances for Stirling Albion and in 2005 McNally was appointed as Assistant manager, McNally remained as a player with the club.

McNally left Stirling Albion at the end of the 2007–08 season to join the Scottish Football Association as part of the youth coaching system.

Managerial career
At the beginning of the 2007–08 season McNally started as a full-time Assistant Manager for Stirling Albion.

On 9 June 2010 he was appointed as Allan Moore's assistant at Greenock Morton. He and Moore were sacked on 23 November 2013 after a 5–1 home defeat to Livingston.

McNally has been a coach with Celtic's youth academy since 2013.

Career statistics
Source:

Honours
 Scottish Cup: 1
 1994–95
 Scottish League Cup Runner-up: 1
 1994–95

References

External links
 

1971 births
Living people
Footballers from Motherwell
Scottish footballers
Celtic F.C. players
Southend United F.C. players
Stoke City F.C. players
Scottish expatriates in Iceland
Dundee United F.C. players
Knattspyrnudeild Keflavík players
Ayr United F.C. players
Partick Thistle F.C. players
Stirling Albion F.C. players
Greenock Morton F.C. non-playing staff
Expatriate footballers in Iceland
Scottish Football League players
Scottish Premier League players
English Football League players
People educated at Taylor High School, New Stevenston
Scotland under-21 international footballers
Clydebank F.C. (1965) players
Association football defenders